Glenallen Hill (born March 22, 1965) is an American former Major League Baseball outfielder. Hill played with the Toronto Blue Jays (1989–91), Cleveland Indians (1991–93), Chicago Cubs (1993–94, 1998–2000), San Francisco Giants (1995–97), Seattle Mariners (1998), New York Yankees (2000), and Anaheim Angels (2001) during his thirteen-year career. With the Yankees, he won the 2000 World Series over the New York Mets. Hill batted and threw right-handed. Hill was also infamous for his defensive escapades, which were once described by then-Mariners pitching coach Bryan Price as "akin to watching a gaffed haddock surface for air."

Early life
Hill was born to Felton Hill and Francile McDuffie-Hill in Santa Cruz, California, where his mother worked at Dominican Hospital. His father worked as a trucker and later in construction.

Hill graduated from Santa Cruz High School in 1983 where he was a three-sport star. He committed to attend Arizona State University where he had received scholarship offers to play both baseball and football.

He was drafted by the Toronto Blue Jays in the 1983 Major League Baseball draft, in the ninth round and 219th overall.

Career

Toronto Blue Jays (1989–91)
Hill made his major league debut on July 31, 1989, with the Toronto Blue Jays. He collected his first Major League hit, and RBI single, off of Andy Hawkins. In 19 games that year, he collected 15 hits including his first career home run and seven runs batted in. His play that season allowed him to remain with the team for the 1990 season, where he hit .231 over 84 games including 12 home runs and 32 runs batted in. In 1991, he played in 35 games for the Blue Jays compiling a .253 average. On June 27, 1991, Hill was traded to the Cleveland Indians.

Cleveland Indians (1991–93)
Hill played in 37 games for the Indians in 1991 collected 32 hits while driving in 14 runs. In his first and only full season in Cleveland in 1992, Hill played in 102 games collecting 18 home runs and 49 runs batted in (then career-highs). Hill played in 66 games for the Indians in 1993 and hit only .224 before being traded to the Cubs on August 19. While a member of the Cleveland Indians, he committed a "phantom steal" of second. This occurred during a game against the Detroit Tigers which was interrupted by a prolonged disturbance in the outfield. When play resumed, no one noticed that Hill had moved from first to second, thus giving him a stolen base.

Chicago Cubs (1993–94)
Hill played in 31 games for the Cubs in his first season hitting .345 while driving in 22 runs. In 1994, Hill played in 89 games and clubbed 10 home runs while collecting 38 runs batted in before the 1994–95 Major League Baseball strike  cancelled the remainder of the season. On April 7, 1995, he was granted free agency.

San Francisco Giants (1995–97)
Hill signed with the Giants on April 9, 1995, where he hit .264 with 24 home runs and 86 runs batted in along with a career-high 25 stolen bases. The following year, he played in 98 games hitting .280 with 19 homers and 67 runs batted in. In 1997, he hit .261 with 11 home runs and 64 runs batted in. Hill was the first National League player to serve as a designated hitter in regular season play, doing so on June 12, 1997, in the first-ever game in interleague play as his San Francisco Giants faced the Texas Rangers at The Ballpark at Arlington. That year, he played in his first postseason game against the Marlins. He went 0 for 7 with two walks. Following the Giants defeat, Hill was granted free agency on October 29.

As Hill grew up near San Francisco, during his stint with the San Francisco Giants he often reached out to the community in which he grew up, making numerous public appearances and autograph signings.

Seattle Mariners (1998)
Hill signed with the Mariners on January 8, 1998, and hit .290 with 12 homers and 33 runs batted in before being placed on waivers and claimed by the Cubs.

Return to Chicago (1998–2000)
Hill was selected off waivers by the Cubs on July 6, 1998. In 48 games Hill hit .351 with 8 homers and 23 runs batted in. Hill also played in one game during the 1998 National League Division Series where he was one for three with a run batted in and a stolen base. He was granted free agency on October 23, but re-signed with the Cubs on December 7. Hill hit .300 with 20 home runs and 55 runs batted in during the 1999 season. He played in 64 games in 2000 and hit .262 with 11 home runs. On May 11, 2000, Hill became the first, and thus far only player to hit a home run on the three-story residential building across the street from Wrigley Field at 1032 W. Waveland Ave. The shot came off Steve Woodard in the second inning of the Cubs' 14–8 loss to the Milwaukee Brewers. He was traded to the Yankees on July 23.

New York Yankees (2000)
Hill played in 40 games for the Yankees, mostly as a designated hitter. He hit 16 home runs in a rotating designated hitter role and was added to the postseason roster. He played in four games in the 2000 American League Division Series against the Oakland A's and was 1 for 12 with 2 runs batted in. In the 2000 American League Championship Series against the Seattle Mariners, Hill played in two games and went 0 for 2, striking out in both of his plate appearances. In the 2000 World Series against the New York Mets, Hill played in three games going 0 for 3. He earned a World Series ring when the Yankees defeated the Mets in five games.

Anaheim Angels (2001)
On March 28, 2001, Hill was traded to the Angels for minor-leaguer Darren Blakely. He appeared in only sixteen games that year, hitting .136 before being released on June 1. He retired after the season.

In a 13-year major league career, Hill compiled a lifetime batting average of .271, hitting 186 home runs and driving in 586 RBIs in 1,162 games. As a pinch hitter Hill had a .287 lifetime average with 13 home runs.

Coaching career
In 2003, he began coaching in the Colorado Rockies minor league system before being named first base coach following the 2006 season.

In 2007, Hill started wearing a helmet while coaching first base following the death of Tulsa Drillers (a Rockies minor-league affiliate) first base coach and former major leaguer Mike Coolbaugh from injuries sustained when hit in the head by a batted ball. Hill and Oakland's Rene Lachemann were the only coaches at the major league level to do so that year. Hill quickly became an advocate for all first base coaches to wear helmets. In 2007, Joe Garagiola Jr. (then Vice President of Baseball Operations), adopted a rule requiring all professional baseball base coaches to wear helmets beginning in 2008.

Hill managed the Colorado Springs Sky Sox during the 2013 and 2014 seasons while the Sky Sox were the AAA affiliates of the Colorado Rockies. He was named the manager of the Albuquerque Isotopes on January 8, 2015, after the Colorado Rockies changed their AAA affiliation from Colorado Springs to Albuquerque Isotopes.

Steroid allegations

Mitchell Report
In December 2007, Hill was included in the Mitchell Report in which it was alleged that he had used performance-enhancing drugs during his career. In the report, Kirk Radomski alleged that he met Hill at a social function in 2000 during which they discussed Hill's dissatisfaction with the results from his use of HGH. Radomski claims he sent Hill a complimentary bottle of HGH, which Hill tried — then later expressed his satisfaction with the results. Radomski stated that Hill purchased two kits of HGH from him and provided a photocopy of a cancelled check from Hill for $3,200. Hill's phone number and address were also included in Radomski's address book.

As an employee of Major League Baseball, Hill was required to submit to an interview by the Mitchell investigators. During the interview, Hill denied having used the HGH provided by Radomski, citing that he had been suffering from marital stresses at the time. He stated that this had been a one-time purchase, and that he had never used performance-enhancing substances. He admitted that the drugs had stayed in his possession until 2007 when he discovered them while unpacking from a move. Hill claimed that he couldn't remember other players with whom he may have discussed steroid use, and noted that his lawyer had warned him that naming players would hurt his career.

On December 20, 2007, Hill was also named in Jason Grimsley's unsealed affidavit as a user of steroids. Hill and Grimsley were teammates on the 2000 New York Yankees.

Personal life
During his early career, Hill was forced to go on the disabled list after suffering injuries during a sleepwalking incident. Hill, an arachnophobe, had a nightmare about being attacked by spiders and in the process went sleepwalking to try to get away. When he woke up from the incident, he had cuts all over his hands and feet due to walking across shards of broken glass from a table he knocked over and also fell down a flight of stairs. His teammates began calling him "Spiderman" afterwards.

In 1995, he married Lori Hill (née Domhoff), daughter of noted sociologist G. William Domhoff. They have two children. His son, Glenallen Jr., was a 4th round pick of the Arizona Diamondbacks, in the 2019 MLB Draft and currently plays for their Low-A affiliate the Visalia Rawhide.

See also
List of Major League Baseball players named in the Mitchell Report

References

External links
, or Retrosheet, or The Hardball Times, or Pelota Binaria (Venezuelan Winter League)

1965 births
Living people
African-American baseball coaches
African-American baseball players
Albuquerque Isotopes managers
American expatriate baseball players in Canada
Anaheim Angels players
Baseball coaches from California
Baseball players from California
Canton-Akron Indians players
Cardenales de Lara players
American expatriate baseball players in Venezuela
Chicago Cubs players
Cleveland Indians players
Colorado Rockies (baseball) coaches
Colorado Springs Sky Sox managers
Florence Blue Jays players
Kinston Indians players
Knoxville Blue Jays players
Major League Baseball first base coaches
Major League Baseball left fielders
Major League Baseball right fielders
Medicine Hat Blue Jays players
New York Yankees players
Phoenix Firebirds players
Rancho Cucamonga Quakes players
Sportspeople from Santa Cruz, California
San Francisco Giants players
Seattle Mariners players
Syracuse Chiefs players
Toronto Blue Jays players
Santa Cruz High School alumni
21st-century African-American people
20th-century African-American sportspeople